Marcelo de Mattos Terra or simply Marcelo Mattos (born 10 February 1984 in Indiaporã, São Paulo) is a Brazilian football defensive midfielder who plays for Bangu.

He is known for his positioning, tight marking of the opposing player and the ability to bring the ball forward to other offensive players.

Career
Marcelo was born in Brazil where he began at Mirassol a third division club in Brazil he then left for FC Tokyo in the J1 League. After exceptional performances he transferred to Associação Desportiva São Caetano where he then left for Sport Club Corinthians Paulista. At Corinthians, Marcelo established himself where he excelled alongside Carlos Tevez and Javier Mascherano being dubbed the team of the year after the trio won the Championship.

He was part of the Brazilian team that played at the FIFA U-17 World Championship 2001. At that time he was with Mirassol and impressed so much that FC Tokyo signed him.

Marcelo Mattos has signed for Greek team Panathinaikos for 3 million euros on 6 July 2007 in a 4-year deal.
In July 2008, Panathinaikos acquired the 85% of the players ownership for a fee of 3 million Euros. The rest of the player's percentage belongs to his agent, Pini Zahavi.

On 26 August 2009 Corinthians announced a one-year loan deal with Panathinaikos.

On 20 July 2010 he was announced as a player of Botafogo.
On 3 July 2011 he was sold to Botafogo for 1 million Euros

Club statistics

Honours

Club
São Caetano
Campeonato Paulista: 2004

Corinthians
Campeonato Brasileiro Série A: 2005

Botafogo
Campeonato Carioca: 2013

Individual
 Campeonato Brasileiro Série A Team of the Year: 2005
 Bola de Prata: 2005

Footnotes

External links
sambafoot
placar

1984 births
Living people
Footballers from São Paulo (state)
Brazilian footballers
Brazilian people of Italian descent
Brazilian expatriate footballers
Association football midfielders
Associação Desportiva São Caetano players
Sport Club Corinthians Paulista players
Botafogo de Futebol e Regatas players
FC Tokyo players
Oita Trinita players
Expatriate footballers in Greece
Expatriate footballers in Japan
Mirassol Futebol Clube players
Panathinaikos F.C. players
J1 League players
J2 League players
Campeonato Brasileiro Série A players
Super League Greece players
Santa Cruz Futebol Clube players